Karin Biva (born on 20 April 1962 in Dendermonde) is a Belgian sport shooter. She competed in rifle shooting events at the 1988 Summer Olympics and the 1992 Summer Olympics.

Olympic results

References

1962 births
Living people
ISSF rifle shooters
Belgian female sport shooters
Shooters at the 1988 Summer Olympics
Shooters at the 1992 Summer Olympics
Olympic shooters of Belgium
People from Dendermonde
Sportspeople from East Flanders
20th-century Belgian women